In algebraic topology, a simplicial homotopypg 23 is an analog of a homotopy between topological spaces for simplicial sets. If

are maps between simplicial sets, a simplicial homotopy from f to g is a map

See also 
Kan complex
Dold–Kan correspondence (under which a chain homotopy corresponds to a simplicial homotopy)
Simplicial homology

References

External links 
http://ncatlab.org/nlab/show/simplicial+homotopy

Homotopy theory
Simplicial sets